Pedro Zerbini (born December 9, 1988) is a former Brazilian tennis player born in São Paulo, Brazil.

Zerbini has a career high ATP singles ranking of 463 achieved on 25 February 2013. He also has a career high ATP doubles ranking of 409 achieved on 4 March 2013.

Zerbini made his ATP main draw debut at the 2013 Brasil Open after receiving a wildcard for the doubles main draw.

References

External links

1988 births
Living people
Brazilian male tennis players
20th-century Brazilian people
21st-century Brazilian people